Danny Elliott Means II, better known by his stage name Butch Cassidy, is an American singer from Long Beach, California. He has worked with numerous West Coast hip hop musicians, including Nate Dogg, Snoop Dogg, Kurupt, Daz Dillinger, Ice Cube, Xzibit, Warren G, Mack-10, Tray Deee, E-40, WC, DJ Quik, DJ Battlecat, Tha Eastsidaz and more.

Discography

Albums

Guest appearances
1994
The Badlands / Papa Chuk / Vocals (Background)

1996
Be Thankful / Nate Dogg & Butch Cassidy / Christmas on Death Row / Various / Performer

1998
Scared Of Love / Nate Dogg & Danny "Butch" Means / G-Funk Classics, Vol. 1 & 2 / Nate Dogg / Co-composer / Performer
Dirty Ho's Draw / Nate Dogg feat. Butch, Pamela Hale & DJ EZ Dick / G-Funk Classics, Vol. 1 & 2 / Nate Dogg / Performer
I Don't Wanna Hurt No More / Nate Dogg & Danny "Butch" Means / G-Funk Classics Vol. 1 & 2 / Nate Dogg / Performer
It's Goin' Down Tonight / Nate Dogg, Danny "Butch" Means & Isaac Reese / G-Funk Classics Vol. 1 & 2 / Nate Dogg / Performer

1999
Represent Dat G.C. / Kurupt, Daz Dillinger, Snoop Dogg, Soopafly, Tray Deee, Jayo Felony & Butch Cassidy / Tha Streetz Iz a Mutha / Kurupt / Performer

2000
Loud & Clear / Xzibit feat. Butch Cassidy, Defari & King T / Restless / Xzibit / Performer
Let It Go / T.W.D.Y. feat. Butch Cassidy / Lead the Way
G'd Up / Snoop Dogg, Butch Cassidy & Tha Eastsidaz / Snoop Dogg Presents Tha Eastsidaz / Tha Eastsidaz / Performer
Another Day / Snoop Dogg, Butch Cassidy & Tha Eastsidaz / Snoop Dogg Presents Tha Eastsidaz / Tha Eastsidaz / Co-composer / Performer
How You Livin' / Snoop Dogg, Butch Cassidy & Tha Eastsidaz / Snoop Dogg Presents Tha Eastsidaz / Tha Eastsidaz / Performer
Take It Back to '85 / Snoop Dogg, Butch Cassidy, Kurupt & Tha Eastsidaz / Snoop Dogg Presents Tha Eastsidaz / Tha Eastsidaz / Performer
LBC Thang / Snoop Dogg, Butch Cassidy & Tha Eastsidaz / Snoop Dogg Presents Tha Eastsidaz / Tha Eastsidaz / Performer
Wassup / Tha Eastsidaz feat. Butch Cassidy & Lil' Half Dead with Snoop Dogg verse / unreleased / Performer
Lay Low / Snoop Dogg feat. Nate Dogg, Butch Cassidy, The Eastsidaz & Master P / Tha Last Meal / Snoop Dogg / Co-composer / Performer
Loosen' Control / Snoop Dogg feat. Butch Cassidy, Soopafly / Tha Last Meal / Snoop Dogg / Co-composer / Performer
Bang To Dis / Steady Mobb'n feat. Butch Cassidy / Crime Buddies

2001
Tarantula / Tarantula / Mystikal / Performer
This Gangsta Shit Is Too Much / Warren G feat. Butch Cassidy / The Return of the Regulator / Warren G / Performer
They Lovin' Me Now / Warren G feat. Butch Cassidy & Boss Hogg / The Return of the Regulator / Warren G / Performer
Young Locs Slow Down / Warren G feat. WC & Butch Cassidy / The Return of the Regulator / Warren G / Performer
Connected For Life / Mack-10, Ice Cube, WC & Butch Cassidy / Bang or Ball / Mack 10 / Performer
Domestic Violence / Too $hort, E-40 & Butch Cassidy / Chase the Cat / Too $hort / Vocals
Cool / Butch Cassidy, Kokane, Nate Dogg & Tha Eastsidaz / Duces 'n Trayz: The Old Fashioned Way / Tha Eastsidaz / Performer
Livin' In Da City / Butch Cassidy & Da Franchise / Violator: The Album, V2.0 / Various / Performer
Livin' The Life / Prodigy of Mobb Deep, Jadakiss & Butch Cassidy / Violator: The Album, V2.0 / Various / Performer
2001 4dr. Cadillac / Bad Azz, Butch Cassidy & Ras Kass / Personal Business / Bad Azz / Vocals
Bitches / Kurupt feat. Butch Cassidy & Roscoe / Space Boogie: Smoke Oddessey / Kurupt / Performer
Can't Go Wrong / Kurupt feat. DJ Quik & Butch Cassidy / Space Boogie: Smoke Oddessey / Kurupt / Performer
Sickness / X.O. Experience / Tha Alkaholiks / Performer
The Courtroom (Skit) / Bullet Proof Love, Vol. 1 / Performer
Gangsta Wit It / Snoop Dogg, Nate Dogg & Butch Cassidy / Bones (Movie Soundtrack) / Snoop Dogg / Performer
Money, Sex & Thugs / D-Shot feat. E-40, Nate Dogg & Butch Cassidy / Money, Sex, & Thugs / D-Shot / Performer
In The Game / Wiz Dinero feat. Butch Cassidy

2002
You Say Keep It Gangsta / Wyclef Jean feat. Butch Cassidy & Sharissa / Masquerade / Wyclef Jean / Performer
Tears Of A Killa / WC & Butch Cassidy / Ghetto Heisman / WC / Performer
Da Get Together / WC & Butch Cassidy / Ghetto Heisman / WC / Performer
Let's All Roll / Knoc-turn'al, Butch Cassidy, Jayo Felony & Slip Capone / L.A. Confidential Presents: Knoc-Turn'Al / Performer
Just Dippin' (Battlecat Remix) / Snoop Dogg feat. Dr. Dre & Butch Cassidy / unreleased / Performer

2003
Pimp the System / Butch Cassidy & Westside Connection / Terrorist Threats / Westside Connection / Vocals / Guest Appearance
California / Sly Boogy, Butch Cassidy & Truth Hurts / Judgement Day / Sly Boogy / Guest Appearance
California (Bay Remix) / Sly Boogy feat. E-40, 2Pac, Jayo Felony, Roscoe, Kurupt, Mistah F.A.B., San Quinn, Truth Hurts & Butch Cassidy / unreleased / Performer
California (LA Remix) / Sly Boogy feat. Crooked I, Mack 10, 2Pac, Jayo Felony, Roscoe, Kurupt, Truth Hurts & Butch Cassidy / California 12"
Dangerous / Dr. Stank feat. Butch Cassidy / Damizza presents... Baby Ree Mixtape Vol.1 / Performer
Big Boyz / Gangsta, Ice Cube & Butch Cassidy / Penitentiary Chances / Gangsta / Performer
A Thing of the Past / Damizza feat. Butch Cassidy, Roccett & Spit Fiya / unreleased / Performer
Rude Awakening / Shade Sheist & Butch Cassidy / Damizza presents... Baby Ree Mixtape Vol.1 / Performer
Look At Us Now / Mack 10 feat. Da Hood & Butch Cassidy / Ghetto, Gutter & Gangsta / Mack 10 / Performer
Gangstaville / Ghetto Pros feat. Kurupt & Butch Cassidy / Ghetto Pros presents... The Album
I Want You Girl / Butch Cassidy / Malibu's Most Wanted Movie Soundtrack / Performer
Groupie Love / G-Unit & Butch Cassidy / Beg For Mercy / G-Unit / Performer
Struggles / D-Shot & Butch Cassidy / Obstacles /Various / Composer / Performer
Homeboyz / Tupac feat. Jadakiss, DMX & Butch Cassidy / Tupac: Rap Phenomenon II mixtape / DJs Vlad, Green Lantern & Dirty Harry / Performer
Keep On Pressin' On / Tupac feat. Butch Cassidy / Tupac: Rap Phenomenon II / DJs Vlad, Green Lantern & Dirty Harry / Performer
Weekend Jam / Lime Block & Butch Cassidy / Heated / Lime Block / Performer
Money Rules / Fat-Tone, E-40, Nate Dogg & Butch Cassidy / I'mma Get Cha / Performer
Starz / Stacee Adamz feat. Butch Cassidy / Gunz & Butter / Unreleased / Produced by Damizza / Performer

2004
Talk To Me / Butch Cassidy feat. Barbara Wilson / The Baby Ree Mixtape 2004 / Performer
Groupie Love / G-Unit feat. Butch Cassidy / The Baby Ree Mixtape 2004 / Performer
So Dope / Butch Cassidy feat. Knoc-turn'al / The Baby Ree Mixtape 2004 / Performer
Gangsta Lean / Damizza feat. Butch Cassidy, Jayo Felony, Titus Fuck & Down / The Baby Ree Mixtape 2004 / Performer
So Cold / Butch Cassidy feat. DJ Quik / The Baby Ree Mixtape 2004 / Performer
What Would You Do / Damizza feat. Mariah Carey, Nate Dogg & Butch Cassidy / The Baby Ree Mixtape 2004 / Performer
Saturday Night *Damizza feat. Knoc-Turn'Al and L.T. Hutton / The Baby Ree Mixtape
Throw Away Chick *Conway feat. Damizza / The Baby Ree Mixtape 2004  / Performer
In 2's / Damizza feat. Butch Cassidy / The Baby Ree Japan Mixtape / Performer
Top Ballin' / Damizza feat. Butch Cassidy / The Baby Ree Japan Mixtape / Performer
Tight As Fuck / Butch Cassidy & Titus Fuck / The Baby Ree Japan Mixtape / Performer
Dangerous / Dr. Stank feat. Butch Cassidy / The Baby Ree Japan Mixtape / Performer
Once Lover / Butch Cassidy feat. Sno Bunny / The Baby Ree Japan Mixtape / Performer
Crazy Ho' / Xzibit feat. Butch Cassidy, Strong Arm Steady & Suga Free / Weapons of Mass Destruction / Xzibit / Performer
U Neva Know / Lil' Flip & Butch Cassidy / U Gotta Feel Me / Lil' Flip / Guest Appearance
Western Conference / Conway feat. Butch Cassidy / How The West Was One / Performer / Produced by Damizza
Doing This Foe Life / Goldie Loc, Tray Deee, Butch Cassidy & Blaqthoven / Tha After Party (Goldie Loc) / Gang Bang Muzic: Frequency Of The Streets (Tha Eastsidaz)
Backstage / I-20 & Butch Cassidy / Self Explanatory / I-20 / Performer
OG Anthem / I-20 & Butch Cassidy / Self Explanatory / I-20 / Performer
Titus Fuk / Titus feat. Butch Cassidy / Damizza presents: The Baby Ree Mixtape Vol. III / Performer
When Daddy Calls / Butch Cassidy / Damizza presents: The Baby Ree Mixtape Vol. III / Performer
Doghouse Soul Food / Snoop Dogg feat. Butch Cassidy & Lil' Flip / The Revival / DJ Whoo Kid & Snoop Dogg / Performer
Find A Way (Original Version) / 213 feat. Butch Cassidy / The Hard Way (Advance)

2005
Don't Fuck With Us / Damizza feat. Butch Cassidy, Rocket, & Spitfiya / California Love Part 2 / Performer
So Gangsta / Mack 10 & Butch Cassidy / Hustla's Handbook / Mack 10 / Performer
We Roll / Guce & Butch Cassidy / Guce presents Pill Music The Rico Act, Vol. 1 / Guce / Performer
Cognac & Doja / Mack 10, Butch Cassidy & Young Soprano / Hustla's Handbook / Mack 10 / Performer
Soul Food / Kokane feat. Butch Cassidy, LaToiya Williams & Snoop Dogg / Mr. Kane Part 2  / Kokane / Performer
I'm Gone / Capone feat. Devin The Dude & Butch Cassidy / Pain, Time And Glory / Capone / Performer
Outro / Baby Bash feat. Butch Cassidy, Don Ciscone, Mr. Kee, Nino Brown & Russell Lee / Super Saucy / Baby Bash / Performer
Ride Wit Me / The Relativez & Butch Cassidy / Money Respect Money / The Relativez / Performer

2006
Tuff / Damani feat. Butch Cassidy / Congratulations Playa Mixtape by DJ Reflex & DJ Skee / Damani / Performer
Back & Forth / Amir feat. Butch Cassidy / Lyrical Terrorism
Just Like To Roll / Amir feat. Butch Cassidy / Lyrical Terrorism
So Fly / Jayman feat. Butch Cassidy / All Questions Asked
Bang This feat. Snoop Dogg

2007
Cruzin' / Butch Cassidy / Back B4 You're Lonely / Performer
A View From the Top / Butch Cassidy feat. Bishop Lamont / Back B4 You're Lonely / Performer
Dodgeball / WC ft. Butch Cassidy & Snoop Dogg / Guilty by Affiliation / Performer
Let Em Know / Kurupt & J. Wells feat. Tha Liks & Butch Cassidy / Digital Smoke
History / Kurupt & J Wells feat. Butch Cassidy / Digital Smoke
I Got Swagger / Butch Cassidy / Cali Connected Vol.9
King Cong Playas / Butch Cassidy / King Cong Playas
Picture Me Rollin' (Nu-Mixx) / 2Pac Feat. Kurupr, Butch Cassidy & Danny Boy / Nu-Mixx Klazzics Vol. 2
Pain (Nu-Mixx) / 2Pac Feat. Styles P & Butch Cassidy/ Nu-Mixx Klazzics Vol. 2
Pain (Alternative Remix) . 2Pac Feat. Styles P & Butch Cassidy/ Nu-Mixx Klazzics Vol. 2

2008
All I See / Butch Cassidy feat. Snoop Dogg
Cant Be Touched / Spirit feat. Butch Cassidy
Take Me Away / Ice Cube Feat. Butch Cassidy / Raw Footage / Performer
All On The Line / Indef feat. Butch Cassidy, Cubin, Noni Spitz & Young De / The Product
Take A Picture / Spirit & Big Tank feat. Butch Cassidy / Swagga Juice
Give It 2 U / Taje feat. Butch Cassidy & Prime / Get It Gang
Street Life / Spider Loc feat. Butch Cassidy, Turf Talk & Kartoon / Da 1 U Love 2 Hate
Sabotage Me / Pr1me feat. Butch Cassidy / The Transformation
Now Here We Are / Pr1me feat. Butch Cassidy / The Transformation
I Got Swagger (Remix) / Butch Cassidy feat. Pr1me / The Transformation
Gangsta Love / Roscoe Umali feat Butch Cassidy, Problem & Styliztic Jones
G-Shit / Lady Of Rage feat. Butch Cassidy, Gail Gotti & Kurupt / Westcoast Gangsta Shit Vol.3
Kickin' / Kiki Smooth feat. Butch Cassidy / Westcoast Gangsta Shit Vol.3
Cruzin' (Remix) / MC Magic feat. Butch Cassidy & Damizza / Princess/Princesa

2009
Fast Car (prod. Qura) / Butch Cassidy
Who Got The Girls / Butch Cassidy / Spirit feat. Fingazz / Performer
Love It Or Leave It / Kitty feat. Butch Cassidy & Daz / Lyrical Gift
Lubrication / Shot Callaz feat. Butch Cassidy / Sweet Dreams
Real G'Z / Neoh & Konflikt feat. Butch Cassidy
Who Wanna / Pr1me feat. Butch Cassidy / Pr1me presents: Stylafornia
On Me / Glasses Malone feat. Butch Cassidy / Monster's Ink
Playa$ Pimp$ Hu$$la$ / Hu$$le feat. Butch Cassidy / Hussle The Album
What A Friend / Butch Cassidy
We Made It / Rah Digga feat. Butch Cassidy / Digital Master Vol.2
My World / Butch Cassidy / MySpace-Exclusive
Mash / Butch Cassidy

2010
Chillin' On The West Coast / Blues Brotherz (Butch Cassidy & Pr1me)
Keep On Ridin' / Tha Dogg Pound feat. Butch Cassidy / Keep On Ridin'
Spread Tha Luv / Tha Dogg Pound feat. Butch Cassidy, Latoya Williams & Celly Cel / 100 Wayz
Behind Closed Doors / Swapper feat. Butch Cassidy / Connect 3 – The Streets Are Watching
Six Feet Deep / Damizza feat. Butch Cassidy & Young De / DJ Wizkid Serving The Streets Vol.1
So Gangsta (Original Version) / Butch Cassidy / DJ Wizkid Serving The Streets Vol.1
So Gangsta / Snoop Dogg feat. Butch Cassidy / More Malice
Gangsta Life / Platinum Stat feat. Butch Cassidy / The New West
Summertime / Prime feat. Butch Cassidy / L.D.I. Radio Vol.1
Behind Closed Doors / Snapper feat. Butch Cassidy / The Connect 3: The Streets Are Watching

2011
Let's Make A Trip / Dogg Master feat. Butch Cassidy / Back In Town
Get It In / Frost feat. Butch Cassidy / All Oldies

2012
I Can Do Without You / E-40 feat. Butch Cassidy / The Block Brochure: Welcome to the Soil 2 (Bonus Track)
Still In Business (Pus-Say) / King Tee feat. Xzibit, Silky Slim & Butch Cassidy

2013
Moves I Make / Daz Dillinger and WC / West Coast Gangsta Shit

2014
California OG / Bad Azz feat Soopafly, Butch Cassidy & Kokane / Flawless EP1
Sun Down In CA / Keyon Stacks feat. Butch Cassidy

2015
It's On / P Knuckle feat. Daz Dillinger, Young Maylay & Butch Cassidy / Perfect Timing - EP
Keep It OG / Organized Cartel feat. Butch Cassidy

2016
Here i come / Butch Cassidy & Mr. Ensane feat. Desert Rose prod. Ill Slim Collin / Grime Funk 
Get On Up / Butch Cassidy Produced by KING GRAINT

2018
In 2 Deep / Damizza feat. Butch Cassidy & Glasses Malone / The Blacklist _Mizztape
On The Westside / Amplified feat. Butch Cassidy / Authenticity
We Made It / Rah Digga feat. Butch Cassidy

References

External links 
Butch Cassidy interview on DubCNN

 https://www.discogs.com/de/artist/173399-Butch-Cassidy

21st-century African-American male singers
American contemporary R&B singers
American hip hop singers
G-funk artists
Living people
Musicians from Long Beach, California
Singers from California
Year of birth missing (living people)